The Mystery of a Hansom Cab is a mystery fiction novel by the Australian writer Fergus Hume. The book was first published in Australia in 1886. Set in Melbourne, the story focuses on the investigation of a homicide involving a body discovered in a hansom cab, as well as an exploration into the social class divide in the city. The book was successful in Australia, selling 100,000 copies in the first two print runs. It was then published in Britain and the United States, and went on to sell over half a million copies worldwide, outselling the first of Arthur Conan Doyle's Sherlock Holmes novels, A Study in Scarlet (1887).

The Mystery of a Hansom Cab received praise in works including A Companion to Crime Fiction, A History of the Book in Australia 1891–1945, and A History of Victoria, and was featured in the book Vintage Mystery and Detective Stories. A parody version was published in 1888, and film adaptations were produced in 1911, 1915 and 1925. The story was adapted into a BBC Radio serial in 1958, a stage play in 1990, a radio promotion in 1991 and a telemovie in 2012.

Author

Originally from Britain, Fergusson Wright Hume worked as a barrister's clerk in Melbourne, Australia, at the time of the book's first publication. He went on to become a prolific author, and wrote more than 130 novels in fiction subjects including adventure and science fiction.

Plot

The Mystery of a Hansom Cab takes place in Melbourne, Australia, and involves an investigation into a homicide, after a corpse is discovered in the early hours, in a hansom cab. Melbourne plays a significant role in the plot and, as the author describes, "Over all the great city hung a cloud of smoke like a pall." The killer's identity is not as significant a revelation in the story as are the roles of the influential and secretive Frettlby family, and their secret: they have a daughter  living on the streets, and the woman everyone assumes is their daughter is illegitimate. The class divide between Melbourne's wealthy and less fortunate is addressed throughout the plot.

The protagonist in the novel is a policeman named Detective Gorby, who is given the task of solving the murder. As Hume describes the character's investigative skills, "He looked keenly round the room, and his estimate of the dead man's character was formed at once." The author commented in a later introduction, "All of the scenes in the book, especially the slums, are described from personal observation; and I passed a great many nights in Little Bourke Street, gathering material". At this time, the street was notorious as a place frequented by prostitutes and criminals.

Publication history

The Mystery of a Hansom Cab was first published in Melbourne in 1886 and in Britain in 1887 (he author self-published the first edition) and in the United States in 1888, by G. Munro. Hume wrote an introduction to a revised edition published in 1898, and later publications have included those by the publishers Arno in 1976, and by Dover in 1982, and a new Australian edition with an introduction by Simon Caterson, in 1999 by The Text Publishing Company, which has been reprinted several times.

Reception

Sales
"A Concise History of Australia" notes that the book became an international bestseller. A Companion to Australian Literature since 1900 noted The Mystery of a Hansom Cab provided Australia with its first international bestseller. and Vintage Mystery and Detective Stories characterized the book as the best-selling detective novel of the 19th century. In Australia, the book sold 25,000 copies in its first print run, and 100,000 copies in its first two print runs. In Britain, in its first six months after publication, 300,000 copies were sold, and, in 1888, sales continued in thousands in Britain each week. According to A Gregarious Culture (2001), "sales of The Mystery of a Hansom Cab, published in 1886, would reach astronomical figures".  Over 500,000 copies were sold in Britain, by the publishing company Jarrold. In the United States, an additional 500,000 copies were sold.

The author did not benefit from the sales of the work, as he had sold his rights to it for £50. A Gregarious Culture identifies "the only known [complete] copy of the first edition" of the book as "a treasure" of the Mitchell Library at State Library of New South Wales. Illustrated London News reported in 1888 on the popularity of the book, "Persons were found everywhere eagerly devouring the realistic sensational tale of Melbourne social life. Whether travelling by road, rail or river the unpretending little volume was ever present in some companion's or stranger's hands." The book outsold the worldwide 1887 publication of the Sherlock Holmes novel A Study in Scarlet by Arthur Conan Doyle.

Reviews

 Charles J. Rzepka and Lee Horsley's A Companion to Crime Fiction (2010) called The Mystery of a Hansom Cab "The most spectacular reimagining of the sensation novel, and a crucial point in the genre's transformation into detective fiction"..
 A History of the Book in Australia 1891–1945 (2001) described the book as "a lively and engaging crime novel which used its Melbourne setting to considerable effect". .
 Geoffrey Blainey wrote in A History of Victoria, The Mystery of a Hansom Cab "did more than any book to give the outside world a picture of Melbourne of the late 1880s".
 David Stuart Davies featured the work in his book Vintage Mystery and Detective Stories, writing, "The author was determined to make a fortune by creating a story containing a mystery, a murder, and a description of low life in Melbourne. He succeeded. Like a rich plum in our vintage mystery pudding we include the whole novel in this collection."

Adaptations
A parody edition, titled The Mystery of a Wheelbarrow (1888), is attributed to a W.  Ferguson. The same year, it was adapted for the stage by Arthur Law.

The Mystery of a Hansom Cab (1911) is a film produced by Amalgamated Pictures, an Australian adaptation of the book.

In 1915, the book was again adapted into a film with screenplay by Eliot Stannard. Directed by Harold Weston, the film starred the actors Milton Rosmer, Fay Temple, A. V. Bramble, James Dale and Arthur Walcott.

A remake of the 1911 version of the film was produced in 1925, in Australia. Made by Pyramid Pictures, The Mystery of a Hansom Cab cast included Arthur Shirley, Grace Glover, Godfrey Cass, Cora Warner and Isa Crossley.

The Mystery of a Hansom Cab was a 1935 reissue of the 1925 Australian silent film. It was released by Pathescope.

A six-part radio serial adaptation was broadcast on the BBC Light Programme from 2 November to 7 December 1958.

The Melbourne television station GTV-9 produced a version of the play in 1962, adapted by Barry Pree, as part of The General Motors Hour.

Michael Rodger adapted the story as a stage play in 1990 and a radio promotion in 1991 by Queensland Performing Arts Trust.

Burberry Entertainment, in association with the Australian Broadcasting Corporation, produced a telemovie adaptation which was premiered on 28 October 2012 and stars John Waters, Oliver Ackland, Helen Morse and Jessica De Gouw.

See also

 Crime fiction
 Detective fiction
 Giallo
 List of crime writers
 Mystery fiction
 Whodunit

References

Sources

Further reading

External links

 
  (plain text and HTML)
 
 Classic Crime Fiction  Fergus Hume bibliography
 Works by or about Fergus Hume at Internet Archive (scanned books & audiobooks, original editions color illustrated)

1886 novels
19th-century Australian novels
Australian mystery novels
Australian novels adapted into films
British novels adapted into films
Novels by Fergus Hume
Novels set in Melbourne